Hlongwane is a surname. Notable people with the surname include:

Fana Hlongwane, South African politician and businessman
Samuel Hlongwane (born 1962), South African Navy officer
Thomas Hlongwane (1962–2006), South African footballer

Surnames of African origin